The spot-winged monarch (Symposiachrus guttula), or spot-wing monarch flycatcher, is a species of bird in the family Monarchidae. It is found in Indonesia and Papua New Guinea. Its natural habitat is subtropical or tropical moist lowland forests.

Taxonomy and systematics
The spot-winged monarch was originally placed in the genus Muscicapa and later Monarcha until moved to Symposiachrus in 2009.

References

Symposiachrus
Birds described in 1828
Taxa named by René Lesson
Taxa named by Prosper Garnot
Taxonomy articles created by Polbot